Parapoliops is a genus of parasitic flies in the family Tachinidae.

Species
Parapoliops grioti Blanchard, 1957

Distribution
Argentina.

References

Exoristinae
Diptera of South America
Tachinidae genera
Monotypic Brachycera genera
Taxa named by Émile Blanchard